Robert Karl Grabarz (born 3 October 1987) is a retired British high jumper. Active during the 2010s, with his greatest success coming in two periods between 2012 and 2017. He was the 2012 European champion, the 2012 Diamond League high jump champion and won a shared silver medal in the 2012 Summer Olympics, which was upgraded from bronze after disqualification of the original winner, Ivan Ukhov of Russia, for doping in 2021. 

He failed to figure at the sharp end internationally in 2014 and 2015, but between 2016 and 2017 Grabarz had a significant return to form, as he won World and European silver medals indoors, and European outdoors silver as well as finishing 4th at the 2016 Summer Olympics.and 6th at the 2017 World Championships. Domestically, Grabarz was a five-time British champion between 2012 and 2017. 

Following a troubled start to his 2018 season, Grabarz announced his immediate representative retirement at the age of 30.

Personal life
Grabarz was born in Enfield, England. His grandfather, Ernst Karl Grabarz (1934–2001), emigrated to England from Poland. Robbie attended Crosshall Junior School and Longsands College in St Neots, Cambridgeshire, and started a foundation degree programme with Loughborough College in 2006.

Career
Grabarz finished twelfth at the 2006 World Junior Championships and competed at the 2011 European Indoor Championships, finishing 23rd and failing to reach the final. Grabarz subsequently failed to qualify for the 2011 World Championships in Athletics and lost his National Lottery funding.

After this string of poor performances and funding loss, Grabarz "realised I didn't want that disappointment to happen again and I realised it was my decision to make it not happen again." He moved to Birmingham to train and "make a fresh start so I could give 100% of what I have to offer." He secured financial help from the Ron Pickering Memorial Fund and BackleyBlack, the company run by former athletes Steve Backley and Roger Black. His coach Fuzz Ahmed commented: "If I hadn't found him backing and if he didn't have a credit card, I would have funded him, because that's how much I believed in him. I recognised he had matured into a person that wanted to be a world class high jumper, rather than somebody who was just a very good high jumper."

2012 saw a much improved Grabarz. In January 2012 he made his international breakthrough by jumping 2.34 metres at an indoor high jump gala in Wuppertal. His previous best was 2.28m and the jump saw him pass the Olympic 'A' qualifying standard. In June, Grabarz won gold at the European Athletics Championships with a jump of 2.31m. He followed this up at the 2012 London Olympics in August, by clearing 2.29 metres in the final to win bronze, in a three-way tie with Canada's Derek Drouin and Qatar's Mutaz Essa Barshim. After victories in the Rome and Birmingham Diamond League events, Grabarz took the overall 2012 IAAF Diamond League high jump crown, winning the Diamond Trophy and $40,000 prize money.

His personal-best jump is 2.37 metres, a mark set at the Lausanne Diamond League meeting on 23 August 2012, equalling the British men's outdoor record held by Steve Smith since 1992.

Grabarz finished joint fourth at the 2016 Olympics. He cleared a season's-best height of 2.33 metres, the same height as bronze medallist Bohdan Bondarenko, at the first attempt but earlier in the competition he had failed at his first attempt at 2.25 metres, meaning that Bondarenko won the bronze on countback.

In May 2018 he announced his retirement, saying that he doesn't enjoy competition anymore.

In 2019, Ukhov was stripped of the gold medal by the Court of Arbitration in Sport for doping offences. As a result, two years later, Grabarz was upgraded to 
the silver medal position, along with Drouin and Barshim. The USA's Erik Kynard, the original silver medallist, was promoted to gold.

International competitions

Diamond League wins
 2012 - Rome & Birmingham
 Won the 2012 Overall Diamond Race High Jump title

References

External links

1987 births
Living people
People from Enfield, London
Athletes from London
English male high jumpers
British male high jumpers
Olympic male high jumpers
Olympic athletes of Great Britain
Olympic silver medallists for Great Britain
Olympic silver medalists in athletics (track and field)
Athletes (track and field) at the 2012 Summer Olympics
Athletes (track and field) at the 2016 Summer Olympics
Medalists at the 2012 Summer Olympics
Commonwealth Games competitors for England
Athletes (track and field) at the 2018 Commonwealth Games
World Athletics Championships athletes for Great Britain
European Athletics Championships medalists
British Athletics Championships winners
New Zealand Athletics Championships winners
Diamond League winners
English people of Polish descent